The new National Council of Slovakia was elected at the 2020 Slovak parliamentary election and consists of 150 representatives elected from party lists. Those elected will sit on the National Council until 2023.

Election Results

Elected members 

 Lucia Ďuriš Nicholsonová
 Richard Sulík
 Igor Matovič
 Eduard Heger
 Radovan Sloboda
 Romana Tabak
 Marek Krajčí
 Boris Kollár
 Robert Fico

References

External links 
 List of elected members

2020
Government of Slovakia
Slovakia